The IMOCA 60 class yacht SODEBO savourons la vie, 25 was designed by Finot-Conq and launched in October 1998, after being made by Kirié in France. The boat was lost in 2016 while on charter to Richard Tolkien when he abandoned ship.  The wreckage was found near Porto Rico.

Racing results

References

1990s sailing yachts
Sailing yachts designed by Finot-Conq
Sailboat type designs by Groupe Finot
Vendée Globe boats
IMOCA 60
Sailboat types built in France